The De Quay cabinet was the executive branch of the Dutch Government from 19 May 1959 until 24 July 1963. The cabinet was formed by the christian-democratic Catholic People's Party (KVP), Anti-Revolutionary Party (ARP) and Christian Historical Union (CHU) and the conservative-liberal People's Party for Freedom and Democracy (VVD) after the election of 1959. The cabinet was a centre-right coalition and had a substantial majority in the House of Representatives with prominent Catholic politician Jan de Quay the former Queen's Commissioner of North Brabant serving as Prime Minister. Prominent Liberal politician Henk Korthals served as Deputy Prime Minister, Minister of Transport and Water Management and was given the portfolio of Suriname and Netherlands Antilles Affairs.

The cabinet served in the early years of the tumultuous 1960s, domestically it had to deal with the beginning of the counterculture and the discovery of the Groningen gas field and it was able to implement several major social reforms to the education system and the public sector and social security, internationally the West New Guinea dispute resulted in the disbandment of the Netherlands New Guinea territory following the Battle of Arafura Sea. The cabinet suffered several major internal conflicts including multiple cabinet resignations, but completed its entire term and was succeeded by a continuation of the coalition in the Marijnen cabinet following the election of 1963.

Formation
Cabinet formation was again difficult due to the growing friction between Labour Party and the Catholic People's Party. Despite the fact that this was the first post-war cabinet with the right-wing VDD and without the socialist PvdA, it continued with the building up social security that was started after the war, made possible by the continually growing economy.

Term
The free Saturday was introduced (for civil servants, in 1961), as well as laws for education (mammoetwet), unemployment benefit (bijstandwet) and child benefit (kinderbijslagwet).  Natural gas was discovered in Slochteren, which would later turn out to be one of the biggest gas reserves in the world and a major source of income for the Netherlands in the decades to come.

On 23 December 1960 the cabinet fell over extra public housing (woningwetwoningen), but Gaius de Gaay Fortman reconciled matters and the cabinet resumed on 2 January 1961.

In August/September 1962, New Guinea was handed over to Indonesia, under supervision of the UN.

Shortly after the installation of the new government, minister of defence Ven den Bergh resigned for personal reasons (family affairs with his United States wife and children). In 1962, the new minister of defence Visser also had to resign after protests against his dismissal of a critical civil servant. In 1961 minister Van Rooy of social affairs resigned after criticism of how he dealt with the new child benefit law. His post was taken over by former state secretary Veldkamp, whose now vacant former position in turn was taken over by Gijzels.

In 1963, a proposal to install commercial television was not accepted.

Cabinet Members

Trivia
 Six cabinet members had previous experience as scholars and professors: Jan de Quay (Applied Psychology and Business Theory), Jelle Zijlstra (Public Economics), Jan de Pous (Public Economics), Gerard Veldkamp (Microeconomics), Willem Hendrik van den Berge (Public Economics) and Harry Janssen (Latin).
 Four cabinet members (later) served as Prime Minister: Victor Marijnen (1963–1965), Jo Cals (1965–1966), Jelle Zijlstra (1966–1967), and Piet de Jong (1967–1971).
 Four cabinet members (later) served as Queen's Commissioners: Jan de Quay (North-Brabant), Edzo Toxopeus (Groningen), Charles van Rooy (Limburg) and Jan van Aartsen (Zeeland).
 The sons of Ministers Henk Korthals (Benk) and Jan van Aartsen (Jozias) would later serve together as Ministers in the Second Kok cabinet  years later.

References

External links
Official

  Kabinet-De Quay Parlement & Politiek
  Kabinet-De Quay Rijksoverheid

Cabinets of the Netherlands
1959 establishments in the Netherlands
1963 disestablishments in the Netherlands
Cabinets established in 1959
Cabinets disestablished in 1963